Tui is a (usually) female given name and nickname among the Māori people of New Zealand. It is also Polynesian and Fijian male given name, often coming from the noble title Tu'i.  People with this name include:

Given name
 Tui Alailefaleula, American football player
 Tui Flower, New Zealand food writer
 Tui Fox (also known as Tui Hemana), New Zealand singer
 Tui Kamikamica, Fijian rugby union player
 Tui Katoa, Tongan rugby league player
 Tui (Tuimoana) Lolohea, New Zealand rugby league player
 Tui Lyon, Australian roller derby player
 Tui Mayo, New Zealand nurse
 Tui McLauchlan, New Zealand artist
 Tui Ormsby, Australian rugby union player
 Tui Samoa, American football player
 Tui Shipston, New Zealand swimmer
 Tui T. Sutherland, American author
 Prince Tui Teka, New Zealand singer
 Tui St. George Tucker, American composer
 Tui Uru, New Zealand opera singer and broadcaster

Fictional people
 Tui Mitcham, character in Top of the Lake, a 2013 New Zealand television mini-series

Surname
 Basile Tui, Wallis and Futuna politician
 Fiu Tui, Tuvaluan boxer
 Hoani Tui, New Zealand rugby union player
 Lukhan Salakaia-Loto, formerly Lukhan Tui, Australian rugby union player
 Ruby Tui, New Zealand rugby union player
 Sara González (footballer), Spanish footballer known as Sara Tui
 Saviour Tui, Samoan-New Zealand netball player
 Sione Tui, Australian rugby union player

See also
Tui (disambiguation)

Māori given names
Polynesian given names
Surnames of Oceanian origin